John Ralph Strickland Taylor (13 December 188313 December 1961) was Bishop of Sodor and Man from 1942 to 1954.

Early life, family and education
Taylor was born on 13 December 1883 and educated at Marlborough and Pembroke College, Cambridge, and trained for the ministry at Ridley Hall, Cambridge. His father, John Charles, was also a priest who served as Vicar of Harmondsworth.

He married Margaret Garrett in 1913, and they had two sons and two daughters: one daughter, Leila Margaret, was born in 1920; and one son, John Vernon Taylor, was also a priest, later becoming Bishop of Winchester.

Ordained ministry
Taylor was made a deacon on Trinity Sunday (22 May 1910) and ordained a priest the next Trinity Sunday (11 June 1911) — both times by Frederic Chase, Bishop of Ely, at Ely Cathedral. He was interviewed for a commission as a Temporary Chaplain to the Forces on 17 January 1917. It was noted that he could speak French but he asked to serve at "home only" and was appointed to the Royal Military Academy at Woolwich. In October, 1918, he was attached to an Essex Battalion based at Hastings but remained there for only two months before demobilisation and appointment to the headship of St Lawrence College, Ramsgate. Later he was Rector of Hodnet with Weston-under-Redcastle (1928–32; for the two years, he was also Rural Dean) then Principal of Wycliffe Hall, Oxford — a post he held until his appointment as a bishop. He was also, alongside his main appointments, an examining chaplain to Bertram Pollock, Bishop of Norwich (1911–42); Edward Burroughs and Geoffrey Lunt, Bishops of Ripon (1932–42); and John Kempthorne and Edward Woods, Bishops of Lichfield (1935–42); an honorary canon of Norwich Cathedral (1938–42); and president of the London College of Divinity from 1945 onwards.

Taylor was consecrated as a bishop at York Minster on the Feast of the Epiphany (6 January) 1943. His appointment to Sodor and Man was made partly on the recommendation of the Bishop of Worcester who thought that Taylor's experience at Ridley Hall would help the theological college on the island.[TNA PREM5/338]. Taylor retired in 1954 and died on 13 December 1961.

References

1883 births
1961 deaths

People educated at Marlborough College

Alumni of Pembroke College, Cambridge
20th-century Church of England bishops
Bishops of Sodor and Man
Deans of Peel
Principals of Wycliffe Hall, Oxford